Luboš Kohoutek (born 29 January 1935) is a Czech astronomer and a discoverer of minor planets and comets, including Comet Kohoutek which was visible to the naked eye in 1973.
He also discovered a large number of planetary nebulae.

Biography
Kohoutek was born in 1935 to Hynek and Jarmila Kohoutek. His brother was the Czech composer Ctirad Kohoutek.

Kohoutek has been interested in astronomy since high school. He studied physics and astronomy at universities in Brno and Prague (finished 1958). Then he started to work in the Astronomical Institute of Czechoslovak Academy of Sciences, where he published a well-cited catalogue (Catalogue of Galactic Planetary Nebulae, 1967). Kohoutek obtained a long term position at the Bergedorf Observatory in Hamburg. After the Soviet occupation of Czechoslovakia (1968) he decided to stay in West Germany (1970). His discoveries in the 1970s made him well-known in the media. In later years Kohoutek worked in observatories in Spain and Chile, working with planetary nebulae. He officially retired in 2001, yet he is still researching at the Hamburg-Bergedorf Observatory. Kohoutek has published 162 scientific works.

Kohoutek is most famous for his discovery of numerous comets, including periodic comets 75D/Kohoutek and 76P/West–Kohoutek–Ikemura, as well as the famously disappointing "Comet Kohoutek" (C/1973 E1).

He has also discovered numerous asteroids, including the Apollo asteroid 1865 Cerberus. The main-belt asteroid 1850 Kohoutek was named after him.

Discoveries
Kohoutek has discovered supernova SN 1973f and 5 comets as well as 76 minor planets.

List of discovered comets
 75D/Kohoutek
 76P/West–Kohoutek–Ikemura
 Comet Kohoutek C/1973 E1 (Kohoutek)
 C/1969 O1-A (Kohoutek)
 C/1973 D1 (Kohoutek)

List of discovered minor planets

References

External links
2011 interview with Luboš Kohoutek

1935 births
Charles University alumni
Czechoslovak astronomers
Discoverers of asteroids
Discoverers of comets

Living people
Masaryk University alumni
People from Zábřeh
Academic staff of the University of Hamburg